The National Library of Uganda was established by an Act of Parliament in 2003, replacing the Public Libraries Board itself established in 1964.

It is the legal deposit library for Uganda and was under the directorship of Gertrude Kayaga Mulindwa. The National Library building is on Buganda Road in the city of Kampala.

Partnerships
In January 2010, The National Library of Uganda partnered with the Library of Congress to digitize local Ugandan materials for the World Digital Library, an internet-based resource to which libraries and archives from throughout the world contribute. In this partnership, National Library of Uganda received funding, training, and equipment. The digitized material is not only preserved but is now available to a broader spectrum of Library Users.

In March 2019, National Library of Uganda was connected to Airtel Uganda 4G Wi-Fi internet.

Book Aid International has donated several books to the National Library of Uganda and launched a partnership project with the library and Worldreader to bring e-readers into children's corners. 10 libraries in Uganda now have e-readers, preloaded with titles to support education and reading.

National Library of Uganda partnered with EIFL (Electronic Information For Libraries) to implement the ‘Digital Skills @ Your Public Library’ initiative.

References

Bibliography
  (Includes information about the national library)

External links
 Official web site

Uganda
Libraries in Uganda
2003 establishments in Uganda
Libraries established in 2003
Buildings and structures in Kampala
World Digital Library partners